The London and North Eastern Railway LNER Gresley Classes A1 and A3 locomotives represented two distinct stages in the history of the British  "Pacific" steam locomotives designed by Nigel Gresley. They were designed for main line passenger services and later express passenger services, initially on the Great Northern Railway (GNR), a constituent company of the London and North Eastern Railway after the amalgamation of 1923, for which they became a standard design. The change in class designation to A3 reflected the fitting to the same chassis of a higher pressure boiler with a greater superheating surface and a small reduction in cylinder diameter, leading to an increase in locomotive weight. Eventually all of the A1 locomotives were rebuilt, most to A3 specifications, but no. 4470 was completely rebuilt as Class A1/1.

The names for the locomotives came from a variety of sources. The first, Great Northern, was named after its parent company. Others were given the names of high-ranking railway officials, but most were given the names of famous racehorses. One was named after the company's most famous long-distance passenger train, the Flying Scotsman. Flying Scotsman is the sole member of the class to be preserved.

Design features and construction history

Class A1: Great Northern genesis

The new Pacific locomotives were built at the Doncaster "Plant" in 1922 to the design of Nigel Gresley, who had become Chief mechanical engineer of the GNR in 1911. The intention was to produce an engine able to handle, without assistance, mainline express services that were reaching the limits of the capacity of the Ivatt large-boilered Atlantics.

Gresley's initial Pacific project of 1915 was for an elongated version of the Ivatt Atlantic design with four cylinders. Finally realising that he was in a design impasse, he took as a model the new American Pennsylvania Railroad class K4 Pacific of 1914. This in turn had been updated from a series of prototypes scientifically developed in 1910 under Francis J. Cole, Alco's Chief Consulting Engineer at Schenectady and the Pennsylvania's K29 Alco prototype of 1911, also designed by Cole. Descriptions of those locomotives appeared in the British technical press at the time and gave Gresley the elements necessary to design a thoroughly up-to-date locomotive.

The first two GNR Pacifics, 1470 Great Northern and 1471 Sir Frederick Banbury  were introduced in 1922. The Great Northern board ordered a further ten '1470-class' locomotives, which were under construction at Doncaster at the time of the formation of the LNER in 1923. This included the future sole surviving member of the class, 4472 Flying Scotsman, then nameless and numbered 1472

In line with the philosophy behind Cole's Alco prototypes, the Gresley Pacifics were built to the maximum limits of the LNER loading gauge with a large boiler and wide firebox giving a large grate area. The firebox was set low and rested on the trailing carrying axle. However, unlike the Pennsylvania K4, the firebox was not of the flat-topped Belpaire variety, but a round-topped one that was in line with Great Northern tradition. Features in common with the American types were the downward profile towards the back of the firebox and the boiler tapering towards the front.

The 1470-class Pacific was the third Great Northern locomotive type to incorporate Gresley's universal 3-cylinder layout. All three cylinders drove the middle coupled axle. The outside cranks were set at 120°, with the inside crank displaced by about 7 degrees to allow for the 1:8 inclination of the inside cylinder, this slight deviation from even spacing being a suggestion by Harold Holcroft of the SECR which enabled the outside cylinders to be perfectly horizontal. Gresley conjugated valve gear derived the motion of the inside valve spindle from the two outside valve spindles: this eliminated an inaccessible middle set of valve gear between the frames. A feature of the K4 that had soon been abandoned by the Pennsylvania Railroad was an unusual three-bar version of the Laird slide-bar. However, Gresley adopted this type of slide-bar for all his locomotives and it was later taken up by Bulleid for his Pacifics and by Riddles for the British Railways standard designs.

LNER period
The Great Northern Railway was incorporated into the newly formed LNER as a result of the 1923 Grouping. Gresley was appointed Chief Mechanical Engineer of the new company, which was the second largest of the "Big Four" railway companies in Britain. Realising the need for standardisation, Gresley adopted his GNR Pacific design as the standard express passenger locomotive for the LNER main line, designating it 'A1' within the LNER locomotive classification system. The choice was made after comparative trials with an equivalent North Eastern Railway Pacific, classified 'A2'. Between 1923 and 1925, 51 A1 locomotives were built; twenty by the North British Locomotive Company, and the remainder by Doncaster Works. However, Gresley's Pacifics had been designed to work within the bounds of the Great Northern Railway, meaning maximum distances of less than 200 miles (322 km). After the grouping, the locomotives were required to have a far greater operating range.

Early improvements
In 1924, number 4472 Flying Scotsman, renumbered and named for the occasion, was displayed at the British Empire Exhibition at Wembley along with the first member of the Great Western Railway (GWR) Castle Class, number 4073 Caerphilly Castle.

In the following months, the two railway companies ran comparative exchange trials between the two types from which the Great Western emerged triumphant with 4079 Pendennis Castle. The LNER learned valuable lessons from the trials which resulted in a series of modifications carried out from 1926 on number 4477 Gay Crusader. Changes to the valve gear included increased lap and longer travel, in accordance with Great Western practice; this allowed fuller exploitation of the expansive properties of steam and reduced back pressure from the exhaust, transforming performance and economy; the economies in coal and water consumption achieved were such that the 180 psi Pacifics could undertake long-distance non-stop runs that had previously been impossible. There followed a complete redesign of the valve gear, which was applied to 2555 Centenary in 1927, with the rest of the class being modified in due course. Locomotives with modified valve gear had a slightly raised running plate over the cylinders in order to give room for the longer combination lever necessary for the longer valve travel. Another modification was made in 1927 when number 4480 Enterprise was fitted with a  boiler. This was closely followed by two other locomotives which also incorporated variations in the cylinder diameter and superheater size for comparative purposes. This led Gresley to make a radical departure from Churchward practice by increasing the number of large tubes containing superheating elements, hence increasing the superheater surface area in contact with the hot gases, thus raising steam temperature. The presence of the larger superheater could be recognised from the square covers on either side of the smokebox, a feature that the locomotives retained throughout the rest of their existence.

At the 1925 British Empire Exhibition, Flying Scotsman was again exhibited; but this time, the GWR sent Pendennis Castle.

Class A3
The outcome of the various experiments and modifications made to the A1s in the late 1920s was a new Class A3 "Super Pacific", the first example of which was number 2743 Felstead. This locomotive appeared in August 1928 with 220 psi (1.52 MPa) boiler, 19-inch (483 mm) cylinders, increased superheat, long-travel valves, improved lubrication and modified weight distribution. Another new development was the changeover from right- to left-hand drive, less convenient for a right-handed fireman, but more so for sighting signals, resulting in the modification of all earlier locomotives.

Twenty-seven A3s were built from new, until 1935, with little variation except for a new type of boiler with a "banjo dome", an oval steam collector that was placed on top of the rear boiler ring. The first banjo dome was hidden beneath the casing of Cock o' the North of 1934; it was subsequently used in the A4 streamliners. The last nine A3 Pacifics were constructed with the device in 1935, and it became a standard fitting on all LNER large, wide-firebox boilers that were applied to new locomotives until 1949. It was also applied to replacement boilers on the A3s.

Although all of the original Class A1 locomotives were eventually rebuilt to Class A3 specifications, it was a drawn-out process that lasted until 1949; 60068 Sir Visto was the last locomotive to be converted. The changeover to left-hand drive took longer, and continued into the Fifties.

Further experiments
Despite having settled on a new standard type, Gresley continued to experiment on individual locomotives, in one of which experiments ACFI feedwater heaters were installed in A1 2576 The White Knight and A3 2580 Shotover. However, on the Pacifics the increase in efficiency was deemed insufficient and the apparatus was eventually removed. In 1935, number 2544 Lemberg received Trofimoff piston valves of an ingenious design with automatically varying steam passages.

A3s 2747 Coronach and  2751 Humorist were subjected to smoke deflection trials following an accident  on the London, Midland and Scottish Railway (LMS) due to poor visibility; this included the modification of the upper smokebox area surrounding the chimney. Originally the whole smokebox wrapper was retained in order to form an air duct, with the exit behind the chimney, but this was found ineffective. The next stage, at least with 2751, was to cut off the top part of the wrapper, but retaining the sloping plate that directed air flow upwards, and therefore lifting the smoke above the locomotive. The original chimney was replaced by a double stove-pipe variety, and miniature deflector plates were added on either side, angled to concentrate the air flow when the locomotive was on the move.

Smoke-lifting devices were not a priority with the normal single-chimney Pacifics. However, with its double chimney and subsequent fitting of a double Kylchap exhaust in 1937, Humorist continued to pose a problem in this regard and always had small wings on either side of the chimney. Finally, in the 1950s, it acquired the Peppercorn-type of deflector plates.

Tenders

The original A1s were coupled to a traditional Great Northern type of tender with coal rails of a design that can be traced back to Stirling days. In 1928, a new special type of tender body was built for the new non-stop Flying Scotsman train. This tender had a corridor connection and an access tunnel through the water tank. In order to be able to pack an extra ton of coal, a single coal rail was provided on this particular series, but was later deemed unnecessary. Ten of these corridor tenders were built, and a non-corridor version of similar design followed with 8-ton coal capacity and no coal rail. Further series of both types had disc wheels instead of the previous spoked variety.

Operational details

Pre-war performance
The early A1 Pacifics were a match for the performances demanded of them in the early 1920s. However this was at the cost of heavy coal consumption, and general performance was well below the ultimate potential of the design. This was largely due to a regression from the earlier 3-cylinder 2-6-0 design, which was the first to have the standard Gresley conjugated motion combined with long valve travel. However, practical problems were experienced with components quickly suffering from premature wear, especially in the main bearing of the large 2:1 lever which had not yet been fitted with the very necessary ball race; excessive 'play' led to so much over-travel of the middle valve, that it began to hit the end-covers. In order to prevent this, when applying the gear to the Pacifics, Gresley fell back on the expedient of shortening valve travel even though that choked the exhaust at speed, was responsible for the heavy coal consumption, and negated most of the advantages gained by the locomotive's revolutionary design. However, by incorporating the Great Western-inspired valve modifications, the economies in coal and water consumption achieved were such that the 180 psi Pacifics could undertake long-distance non-stop runs that were previously impossible.

Initially three A1s and two A3s took turns on this service. The modifications also gave the A1 locomotives greater speed potential, and the proof of this came in 1933 when a high-speed 3-car diesel railcar service had been mooted. As this would have provided limited accommodation for passengers, it was proposed to use steam traction at similar service speeds with six carriages. There were earlier claims to this speed, notably by the Great Western locomotive 3440 City of Truro, but this 1933 run is generally considered to be the first reliably recorded instance. On a later trial run to Newcastle upon Tyne and back in 1935, A3 number 2750 Papyrus reached  hauling  at the same spot, maintaining a speed above  for 12.5 consecutive miles (20.1 km), the world record for a non-streamlined locomotive, shared with a French Chapelon Pacific.

Wartime service
Along with all the Gresley 3-cylinder types, the Pacifics suffered from low wartime maintenance standards, conditions for which they had not been designed. Following Gresley's sudden death in 1941 Edward Thompson took over and following the end of hostilities in 1945 Thompson made a  request to his works staff that a locomotive be selected for rebuild, the first of Gresley's A1 Pacifics, Great Northern was selected and became the LNER Class A1/1 specification with divided drive and separate valve gear for the inside cylinder.  Thompson intended to rebuild to this configuration all the Gresley A1s that had not been converted to A3 standard; in the meantime the remaining Gresley A1s were reclassified as A10s.  The rebuilding of these locomotives as A1/1 never happened.  Instead, the conversion to A3 standard continued.  The A1/1 was at first classified as A1, and reclassified as A1/1 when Arthur Peppercorn  designed and constructed his own Class A1s in 1947 this class owing a great deal to the work of Thompson in showing the improvements that could be made on availability and maintenance costs when compared to the Gresley set up of conjugated valve gear instead of 3 sets.

Post-war recovery and nationalisation

The Gresley 3-cylinder drive arrangement continued to bring a number of practical problems, the root of which was probably the need for the inside cylinder to be steeply inclined in order to give space for the inside connecting rod to clear the leading coupled axle; at the same time, the inside valve spindle had to be parallel with the outside ones from which it derived its motion. This problem had been overcome by what Holcroft called a "twist in the ports" (the passages that carried steam in and out of the cylinders). A consequence was that the length of these passages was greater than that generally recommended, increasing "dead space", and this was combined with a shorter exhaust passage. The net result would be rather different working conditions in the middle cylinder from those on the outside. A contributing problem was that any elongation of the outside valve spindles was multiplied by the conjugated valve gear. Although this had been anticipated at the design stage, the overall consequence was that the inside cylinder had a tendency to give more power than the other two as speed increased, leading to the overloading of the inside connecting rod bearings, especially the big-end which was liable to overheat and fail. Various experiments were tried over the years to cure this chronic ailment, and it was only towards the end of the steam era that a real solution was found in Great Western methods of lubrication and manufacture for the big-end bearing. Other problems persisted, such as a stiff, insensitive regulator and overall design flaws that hampered maintenance.

In spite of all this and the introduction of more recent Pacifics, in the middle of the 1950s Gresley types continued to have a quasi-monopoly of East Coast Main Line express passenger services, and as the Sixties approached they went through yet another series of improvements comparable to those of the 1920s. The most significant of these was the fitting of the French double Kylchap exhaust system, which was entirely due to the persistence from 1956 of P. N. Townend, Assistant District Motive Power Superintendent at King's Cross locomotive shed. These modifications greatly reduced exhaust back pressure, making the locomotives more economical and free-running, and also kept the firetubes clean, reducing turn-around time, so much so that they were able to fit into the more intensive diesel locomotive workings. The Kylchap arrangement was already being universally applied to the A4 streamlined Pacifics, though with the non-streamlined A3 locomotives, the soft exhaust would cause the smoke and steam to drift into the driver's forward vision. The solution came in the form of narrow German-style smoke deflectors, which somewhat changed the appearance of the A3 locomotives in their latter days.

Withdrawal 

The prototype locomotive, number 60113 Great Northern, had been rebuilt by Edward Thompson into a virtually new design. The first to be withdrawn was 60104 Solario in 1959, followed by 60095 Flamingo, and 60055 Woolwinder in 1961.  Otherwise, the class remained intact until 1962, and was still operating on express passenger work. The last class member to be withdrawn by British Railways was number 60052, Prince Palatine in January 1966. 60103 Flying Scotsman was withdrawn in 1963, and has since been preserved at the National Railway Museum in York.

Accidents and incidents
On 10 December 1937, no. 2744 Grand Parade was destroyed in the Castlecary rail accident when it ran into the rear of a standing train in snowy conditions.  The driver and fireman survived with minor injuries although the locomotive and tender were buried under the four following coaches. 35 other passengers and railway crew were killed in the accident.  As Class A3 locomotives were still in production at the time, a replacement was built with the same name and number.
Twenty-one people were killed and 188 were injured.

Twenty-eight people were killed and 65 were injured.
The rear portion was able to run back and cross from the down slow line to the down fast line due to a signalman's error. Locomotive No. 60107 Royal Lancer was hauling a parcels passenger train that collided with the wagons.
On 14 July 1951, locomotive 60058 Blair Athol was hauling the 'West Riding' express near Huntingdon when two of its coaches caught fire. Twenty-two people were injured, but all the passengers and crew escaped with no fatalities. 
On 14 November 1951, locomotive 60100 Spearmint ran away on the 1 in 44 Cowlairs incline approaching Glasgow Queen Street Station. A defective repair on a vacuum pipe had left the engine without brakes. The engine, which was scheduled to work the afternoon departure to Leeds, collided with the stock for the same train which was being shunted across the station, the dining-car crew were injured in the collision.
On 5 August 1957, locomotive No. 60036 Colombo was hauling a passenger train when it crashed into the buffers at  station.
On 15 December 1961, an empty coaching stock train was in a rear-end collision with a freight train at Conington, Huntingdonshire. Locomotive No. 60078 Night Hawk was hauling a freight train that ran into the wreckage. A third freight train then ran into the wreckage.

Preservation

The sole surviving member of the A3s and A1s is 4472 (60103) Flying Scotsman. The locomotive was withdrawn from service with British Railways in 1963 and after being saved from scrap it was sold for preservation to Alan Pegler. After overhaul, Scotsman worked a number of railtours, including a non-stop London–Edinburgh run in 1968, the final year of steam traction on British Railways.

After a much-publicised appeal in 2004, Flying Scotsman was purchased by the National Railway Museum in York and is now part of the National Collection.

A spare A3 boiler that was fitted to 60041 Salmon Trout and 60097 Humorist, but mainly on Salmon Trout survives at National Railway Museum's National Collection. Cylinder parts from Salmon Trout purchased by Alan Pegler still exist to this day, they are a part of Flying Scotsman.

Models

Model railway companies Tri-ang, and later Hornby, have produced 'OO'-scale models of both the Gresley A1's and A3's almost continuously since the 1960s. In the 2000s, Hornby also produced live steam examples, re-using the chassis from the initial LNER Class A4 models. Trix and later Liliput made both loco drive and tender drive versions in 'OO' gauge. Although now owned by Bachmann, the models have never been resurrected. Other manufacturers have produced models in other scales, such as Minitrix, Graham Farish, and Dapol (N-gauge) and Bassett-Lowke (O-gauge).

See also

 List of LNER Class A1/A3 locomotives

Footnotes

References

 
  A commentary on the world of The Railway Series

 
  
 
 
 
 
 
 
 
 
  No Publication date, but certainly around 1935/6

External links

 LNER Encyclopedia Page covering the history and development of the LNER A1/A3 Pacifics

A3
4-6-2 locomotives
Railway locomotives introduced in 1922
Standard gauge steam locomotives of Great Britain
NBL locomotives
2′C1′ h3 locomotives
Passenger locomotives
Three-cylinder steam locomotives